Catholicos-Patriarch has been the title of the heads of the Georgian Orthodox Church since 1010. The first Catholicos-Patriarch of All Georgia was Melkisedek I (1010–1033). In the 15th century the Georgian Orthodox Church was divided into the East and the West parts and accordingly they were ruled by the Catholicos-Patriarch of East Georgia and the Catholicos-Patriarch of West Georgia. 

In 1801, the Kingdom of Kartli-Kakheti (Eastern Georgia) was occupied and annexed by the Tsarist Russian Empire. In 1811, the autocephalous status (independence) of the Georgian Church was abolished by Russia and the Russian Orthodox Church took over its administration.

In 1917, the autocephaly of the Georgian Orthodox Church was restored. The first Catholicos-Patriarch of All Georgia since the restoration of autocephaly was Kyrion II Sadzaglishvili (1917–1918).

To this date there have been 82 Catholicos-Patriarchs, of this 7 have been formally glorified by the Georgian Orthodox Church.

The incumbent Catholicos-Patriarch of the church is Patriarch Ilia II since 1977.

See also
Catholicate of Abkhazia
List of heads of the Georgian Orthodox Church

 
Eastern Orthodox patriarchs